Jacob Pradhan is an Indian politician from the Indian National Congress, who was elected in 2014 from the G. Udayagiri (Odisha Vidhan Sabha constituency) at G. Udayagiri in the state of Orissa.

Career

2014 elections
In the 2014 Odisha Legislative Assembly election, Pradhan won the G Udaygiri seat, defeating the sitting Member of the Legislative Assembly Manoj Pradhan of the Bharatiya Janata Party.

Result
In 2014 election, Indian National Congress candidate Jacob Pradhan defeated Biju Janata Dal candidate Pradeep Kumar Pradhan by a margin of 10,289 votes.

2019 Elections
In 2019, he was denied assembly election ticket by Congress. He contested the election as an independent and lost the seat to Saluga Pradhan of Biju Janata Dal.

Result

Reference
 

Living people 
Year of birth missing (living people)
People from Kandhamal district
Odisha MLAs 2014–2019
Indian National Congress politicians from Odisha